Apewosika may refer to the following places in Ghana:

 Apewosika (Central Region)
 Apewosika (Western Region)